Marc Bernardin (born November 29, 1971) is an American journalist, public speaker, TV and comic book writer, and podcaster.  He has served as film editor for the Los Angeles Times and senior editor for The Hollywood Reporter and Entertainment Weekly.  He has written for GQ, Wired, Details, Vulture, Playboy, and Empire. He has been a staff writer for Castle Rock, Treadstone and Carnival Row, and is currently a supervising producer on Star Trek: Picard.

Career
Bernardin was an intern on Star Trek: Deep Space Nine.

He was a staff writer for the Syfy series Alphas, Hulu's series Castle Rock, based on the stories of Stephen King, USA Network’s series Treadstone, based on the Jason Bourne franchise, and Amazon Prime’s fantasy series Carnival Row. He has written comic books for Marvel, DC Comics, Image Comics and several independent comic publishers. He is the co-creator of the DC comic book series The Highwaymen, which is in development as a major motion picture. He co-hosts the Fatman Beyond podcast with filmmaker Kevin Smith, and a second podcast named The Battlestar Galacticast with Tricia Helfer. In 2018, Bernardin won an Inkpot Award, an honor bestowed annually since 1974 by Comic-Con International.

In 2019, Bernardin joined other WGA writers in firing their agents as part of the WGA's stand against the ATA and the practice of packaging.

On August 18, 2019, it was announced that Bernardin would be serving as writer for Masters of the Universe: Revelation on Netflix. Then, on February 21, 2020 Bernardin was announced to be part of the writing team for the upcoming animated series The Legend of Vox Machina, for Amazon Prime Video.

Bibliography

 Monster Attack Network #1 (2007)
 The Highwaymen #1-5 (2007)
 Infinite Halloween Special #1 (2007)
 Pilot Season: Genius #1 (2008)
 Push #1-6 (2008-2009)
 Wolverine: One Night Only #1 (2009)
 Dark X-Men: The Beginning #2 (2009)
 The Authority #17-21 (2009-2010)
 Grunts (2010)
 Hero Complex (2010)
 Women of Marvel #1 (2010)
 X-Men Origins: Nightcrawler #1 (2010)
 Jake The Dreaming #1 (2011)
 Spider-Man: A Meal To Die For #1 (2011)
 Cartoon Network Action Pack #58 (2011)
 JLA 80-Page Giant 2011 #1 (2011)
 DC Comics Presents: Lobo #1 (2011)
 Static Shock #7-8 (2012)
 Nightwatchman (2012)
 Airwolf Airstrikes #6 (2015)
 Rampage Adventures #7 (2015)
 Genius #1-5 (2015)
 Love Is Love #1 (2016)
 Genius: Cartel #1-5 (2017)
 King In Black: Planet Of The Symbiotes #2 (2021)
 Heroes Reborn: Peter Parker, The Amazing Shutterbug (2021)
 Adora and the Distance (2021)
 Census #1-5 (2022)
 Messenger: The Legend of Muhammad Ali (2023)
 Star Wars: Darth Vader - Black, White & Red #3 (2023)

References

External links
 

1971 births
Living people
21st-century American male writers
African-American journalists
African-American screenwriters
American comics writers
American male screenwriters
American male non-fiction writers
American podcasters
Inkpot Award winners
Male journalists
American male television writers
People from Baldwin, Nassau County, New York
21st-century American screenwriters
21st-century African-American writers
20th-century African-American people